Steve Parker may refer to:

 Steve Parker (artist), multi-disciplinary artist
 Steve Parker (defensive end, born 1956), American football player with the New Orleans Saints
 Steve Parker (defensive end, born 1959), American football player with the Baltimore/Indianapolis Colts
 Steve Parker (Neighbours), fictional character from the Australian soap opera Neighbours
 Steve Parker (writer) (born 1952), British science writer

See also
 Steven Parker (disambiguation)
 Stephen Parker (disambiguation)